The Carolina–Duke rivalry refers to the sports rivalry between the University of North Carolina Tar Heels and Duke University Blue Devils, particularly in the sport of basketball. It is considered one of the most intense rivalries in all of US sports: a poll conducted by ESPN in 2000 ranked the basketball rivalry as the third greatest North American sports rivalry, and Sports Illustrated on Campus named it the #1 "Hottest Rivalry" in college basketball and the #2 rivalry overall in its November 18, 2003 issue. The intensity of the rivalry is augmented for many reasons. One reason is by the proximity of the two universities—they are located only ten miles apart along U.S. Highway 15–501 (also known as Tobacco Road) or eight miles apart in straight-line distance. In addition, Duke is a private university whereas Carolina is a public school; the vastly different funding structures and cultures between the two further contribute to the intensity of the rivalry. However one of biggest reasons for this rivalry lies in their respective basketball programs. Almost every year at least one of the schools is a contender to win the national championship.

Carolina leads the rivalry 143–117.

Men's basketball

Duke and North Carolina played their first basketball game on January 24, 1920. The two teams have met at least twice a year since then.  The games frequently determine the Atlantic Coast Conference (ACC) champion; since the ACC's founding in 1953, Duke and Carolina have combined to win or share 49 ACC regular season titles (77.7% of the total) and 38 tournament titles (59.4% of the total), including 14 of 15 from 1996 to 2011. The final game of the regular season for both schools alternates between Chapel Hill and Durham and has been played in Cameron Indoor Stadium since 1940 and the Dean E. Smith Center since 1986.

The Carolina–Duke rivalry is all the more intense because the two schools have consistently been among the nation's elite men's basketball teams for most of the last 40 years. Both schools are also two of the most victorious programs in NCAA men's basketball history; Carolina is third on the list of all-time winningest programs in Division I history, while Duke is fourth. Carolina has won six NCAA championships and appeared in a record 21 Final Fours,
Additionally, Carolina was also retroactively awarded a national championship by the Helms Athletic Foundation in 1942 for their undefeated 1924 season.

Combining for eleven national championships over the last 36 years, Duke and  Carolina have captured 28% of the national championships, or greater than one every four years. Over the past 18 years, one of the two teams has been the AP pre-season #1 ranked team in the country 8 times (44% of the time). Since 1977–78, Duke or  Carolina has been in the pre-season top three 28 times (70%). Over the entirety of the AP poll (the past 69 years), the teams have been in the pre-season top four 69% of the time. Over this same period, one has been pre-season #1 18 times, making it an almost 3 in 10 chance that Duke or North Carolina starts the year at #1 in the last 50+ years. One of the two teams has peaked at AP #1 in 32 separate seasons since 1977, a 7 in 10 chance that Duke or Carolina peaked as the top-ranked team in the country at some point in the season since 1977.

History
Though the two schools have always had the great emotion born of familiarity and proximity, some of the earliest roots of the modern basketball rivalry occurred in the early 1960s when Art Heyman reneged on his commitment to play for North Carolina in order to commit to playing for Duke. After a brawl between the two universities' freshman teams during the 1959–60 season involving Heyman and North Carolina's Dieter Krause, tensions heightened further during a February 4, 1961, varsity game when a brawl occurred initiated by Heyman and North Carolina's Larry Brown, which resulted in suspensions for both players. The rivalry reached unprecedented heights in the mid-1980s under head coaches Dean Smith of North Carolina and Mike Krzyzewski of Duke, thanks to the emergence of cable channels such as ESPN and the increasing coverage of the ACC in national broadcasts by the three major networks, giving a vast national audience more opportunities to witness the two teams and their coaches.  Indeed, the two teams have been fixtures on national television since the early 1980s, and their final regular season clash has been nationally televised for most of that time.

When Smith retired after the 1997 season, he held what was at the time the record for most wins by an NCAA Division I men's head coach, with 879 wins. On December 29, 2010, against the University of North Carolina at Greensboro, Duke head coach Mike Krzyzewski passed coach Smith with his 880th win to become the 2nd all-time winningest coach in Division I men's basketball, (a mark he has since surpassed). In 1982, with players Michael Jordan, Sam Perkins and James Worthy, coach Smith won his first national championship and second overall for UNC that year.  In 1991 Duke won its first national championship and then with most of their team returning, won another national championship in 1992.

North Carolina then won the championship the next year in 1993. Since then, Duke won the national championship in 2001, 2010 and 2015 while North Carolina won national championships in 2005, 2009, and 2017. In 2011, Krzyzewski became the new holder of the record for most career wins by a D-I men's coach, surpassing his mentor Bob Knight (who had surpassed Smith in 2007). On January 25, 2015, Krzyzewski also became the first NCAA Men's Division 1 Basketball head coach to reach 1,000 career wins after Duke defeated St Johns in Madison Square Garden 77–68. On February 16, 2019, Krzyzewski won his 1,123rd game to become the all-time winningest coach in college basketball history at any level (men's or women's), passing Harry Statham of Division II McKendree University.

After Smith's retirement in 1997, North Carolina suffered through three coaching changes (from Dean Smith to Bill Guthridge to Matt Doherty to Roy Williams) between 1997 and 2003. The six seasons between Bill Guthridge and Matt Doherty from 1997 to 2003 Duke won 13 of 17 games against North Carolina and some said that the rivalry was on the decline. However, with the arrival of North Carolina's alumnus Roy Williams as head coach in 2003, North Carolina won six regular season titles in eight years (2005, 2007, 2008, 2009, 2011, 2012), won the ACC tournament in back to back years in 2007 and 2008 and won its fourth, fifth, and sixth NCAA championships in 2005, 2009, and 2017 respectively. North Carolina also won 6 of 8 games against Duke from 2005 to 2009.  Erik Spanberg of The Christian Science Monitor even argued in 2008 that the rivalry has tilted towards North Carolina in recent years.
However, since 2009 and as of March 11, 2017 Duke has won 13 of the past 18 games against North Carolina including 3 season sweeps over North Carolina in 2010, 2013 and 2015 and Duke has won 2 national championships since then in 2010 and 2015. During the 2009–2010 season, Duke won the regular season finale by 32 points, which was the second largest Duke win in series history.

Following that game, Duke went on to win a fourth National title in 2010.

In 2017, UNC won its 6th national title, and the rivalry has been in UNC's favor ever since.  UNC won 2 out of 3 matchups against Duke in 2018, 2019, and 2022.  UNC swept Duke 2–0 in 2021.  In 2022, UNC defeated Duke in Coach K's final home game in Cameron, and then a month later defeated Duke in Coach K's final game ever in the 2022 Final Four.

Former Esquire editor and author (and North Carolina graduate) Will Blythe argues that the rivalry's passion can be attributed greatly to class and culture in the South.

The rivalry has been the subject of various books and articles, including To Hate Like This Is to Be Happy Forever by Blythe and Blue Blood by Art Chansky.

Further illustrating the intensity of the rivalry, U.S. Representative Brad Miller, a die-hard Carolina fan, told an Associated Press writer in 2012, "I have said very publicly that if Duke was playing against the Taliban, then I'd have to pull for the Taliban."

NCAA tournament/postseason NIT
Prior to their meeting in the 2022 NCAA Final Four, North Carolina and Duke's only other postseason meeting was at the 1971 National Invitation Tournament, with North Carolina winning 73–67 in the semifinals at Madison Square Garden. Under current bracket rules, if both teams qualify for the NCAA tournament, the earliest both teams would be able to meet in the NCAA tournament is the regional semifinals (Sweet Sixteen) due to facing each other at least twice per season. If both teams meet three or more times (typically by meeting one another in the ACC tournament), then the earliest both teams can meet in the NCAA tournament is the Regional Finals (Elite Eight).

In 1991, the teams came within one game of playing each other for the national championship, as both advanced to that year's Final Four at the Hoosier Dome in Indianapolis. Chansky writes in Blue Blood that Carolina fans chanted "0-for-4!" at the Duke fans (referring to Duke's previous Final Four runs) while Duke responded with "Long time, no see!" (as this was Carolina's first Final Four since the 1982 national title season). In the first semifinal, North Carolina was upset 79–73 by a Kansas team coached by Roy Williams, who would later return to Chapel Hill to take the head coaching job. Some Duke fans had already arrived for their team's game by the time Dean Smith was ejected for arguing with the officials, and Chansky writes that they were ecstatic at the ejection, waving their hands and yelling, "See ya!" as they normally did at Cameron for a player or coach who was ejected or in foul trouble.

Below, in the Duke locker room, the Blue Devils were preparing for a rematch of the 1990 title game with UNLV in their semifinal. UNLV had won that game by 30 points and had come in undefeated in 1991, with many wondering if they were the best college basketball team ever. When the Carolina-Kansas result news got through, Mike Krzyzewski asked the team if they felt it was okay to lose since that meant they would do no worse than the Tar Heels, and some nodded. Krzyzewski understood but then added, "Flush it. Let's go kick their ass." Duke then stunned the sports world by defeating UNLV 79–77 and then went one better by beating Kansas 72–65 in the championship game to win its first national title. Chansky writes that one UNC athletic department staffer in Indianapolis was so distraught that he did not leave his hotel room the day after the national championship game, while when Duke arrived back in Durham, Krzyzewski is said to have asked the team at a turnoff to Chapel Hill if the team wanted to cruise down Franklin Street. In the wake of the Final Four, when talking about how close the two rivals came to meeting for the national championship, Krzyzewski said that he never wanted to see it happen because regardless of who won, the pain of losing that game would be unbearable for the defeated school and its fans.

Memorable games and incidents

March 2, 1968: #10 Duke 87, #3 North Carolina 86 (3OT)
At Duke Indoor Stadium, Durham
Duke defeated North Carolina 87–86 in triple overtime at Duke Indoor Stadium (later renamed Cameron Indoor Stadium) when seldom used Duke junior Fred Lind erupted for 16 points, 9 rebounds, and 3 blocks, having previously scored 21 points during his entire career.  When Duke All-American center Mike Lewis picked up his third foul in the first half (and Warren Chapman, his backup, had a knee injury), Duke coach Vic Bubas called on Lind to fill the void against UNC greats Rusty Clark and Bill Bunting.  Lewis returned in the second half, but fouled out (four Blue Devils and one Tar Heel fouled out of the game) with about five minutes left in regulation when Duke was down by five, and Lind returned to the court.  Lind went on to carry the Blue Devils in the three overtimes, blocking North Carolina's shot attempt at the end of regulation, making two free throws at the end of the first overtime, and knocking down a 15-foot jumper at the buzzer to send it into a third overtime.  Lind would be celebrated for the action by being carried to Duke's main quad.

March 25, 1971: #13 North Carolina 73, Duke 67
At Madison Square Garden, New York City (National Invitation Tournament Semifinals)
The first-ever postseason meeting and the only one before 2022. North Carolina not only won the game but also went on to win the 1971 NIT after beating Georgia Tech 84–66, while Duke lost the third-place game to St. Bonaventure. UNC's Bill Chamberlain was named tournament MVP after scoring 87 points in the tournament including 34 against the Yellow Jackets.

March 2, 1974: #4 North Carolina 96, Duke 92 (OT)
At Carmichael Auditorium, Chapel Hill
8 Points in 17 Seconds.  Duke led UNC 86–78 with 17 seconds left.  Despite the deficit and despite the fact that the game took place prior to the implementation of the three-point shot, Carolina rallied with a pair of free throws by Bobby Jones, then baskets by John Kuester and Jones after a steal by Walter Davis and a turnover on inbounds attempts. After Duke's Pete Kramer missed the front end of a one-and-one, UNC tied the score on Davis' 30-foot bank shot as time expired.  The game went into overtime, where UNC prevailed, 96–92.

January 3, 1975: Duke 99, #8 North Carolina 96 (OT)
At Greensboro Coliseum, Greensboro (Big Four Tournament)
In a Big Four Tournament matchup between North Carolina and Duke, the two teams played a see-saw game until a 10–0 Duke run in the second half made the score 64–56.  North Carolina eventually tied the score at 70–70 with four minutes to go.  Duke went back up by four with 1:41 to go, but a driving layup by Phil Ford with eight seconds to go in regulation tied the score at 82 and extended the game to overtime.  The Blue Devils got quick baskets from Kevin Billerman and Bob Fleischer to open the overtime but the Tar Heels answered and eventually took the lead, 89–88, on two Ford free throws with two minutes to go.  Duke answered with four straight points and North Carolina came back to tie the score at 92, and then Tate Armstrong converted a three-point play to put the Blue Devils ahead for good.  The teams combined for eight points in the final 20 seconds of the game, but Duke's free throw shooting gave them the 99–96 win.  Fleischer led Duke with 26 points and Phil Ford scored 22 for North Carolina.

February 24, 1979: #6 Duke 47, #4 North Carolina 40

At Cameron Indoor Stadium, Durham
Jim Spanarkel's Senior Day game turned into one of the strangest afternoons in ACC basketball history as Duke held Carolina scoreless for a half before knocking off the No. 4-ranked Tar Heels 47–40. Dean Smith resorted to the four corners offense and the Tar Heels held the ball throughout the first half, but Duke led 7–0 as Spanarkel forced two turnovers, assisted on a basket to Mike Gminski and scored the last bucket of the half on a short jumper. (Smith later said, "It should have been 2–0, or something like that, at the half.") Carolina's only two shots of the first half were air balls, that resulted in the first-ever chants of "Air ball . . . Air ball!" from the Cameron Crazies. Spanarkel added 15 points in the second half and finished with a game-high 17, hitting 8-of-9 field goal attempts. The win allowed Duke to tie North Carolina for the ACC regular season title.

Duke coach Bill Foster wasn't amused by Smith's tactics in the first half and the next day said, "I've been doing this a long time, but during the first half last night I began to think maybe I've been doing it for too long." He then added this infamous dig: "I thought Naismith invented basketball, not Dean Smith."

December 5, 1980: #10 North Carolina 78, Duke 76
At Greensboro Coliseum, Greensboro (Big Four Tournament)
Carolina led by as many as 11 in the first half of the Big Four Tournament contest before Duke trimmed the lead to five at halftime.  Carolina played much of the second half shorthanded as Al Wood and Sam Perkins got into foul trouble; Perkins would foul out with 7:55 to go. James Worthy did his best to pick up the slack, leading the Tar Heels with 26 points and hitting eight straight shots at one point in the second half.  Nevertheless, Gene Banks was able to give Duke only its second lead of the game, 73–71, with 2:36 left.  Carolina came back to tie it at 76.  Future Tar Heel head coach Matt Doherty, a freshman at the time, was then fouled, and hit a free throw with 12 seconds remaining to provide the winning margin.  A Jimmy Braddock free throw in the final second gave Carolina the 78–76 victory.

February 28, 1981: Duke 66, #11 North Carolina 65 (OT)

At Cameron Indoor Stadium, Durham
Duke struggled in its first season under Coach Mike Krzyzewski, going 17–13 overall and 6–8 in the ACC.  However, the Blue Devils' regular-season finale was one to remember.  On Senior Night, Duke's Gene Banks put on a tuxedo and threw roses to the crowd at Cameron Indoor Stadium before the game.  Carolina controlled the game early, then went scoreless over a four-minute stretch of the second half to allow Duke to take a 46–45 lead late in regulation.  The Tar Heels fought back to go up 50–49, and the teams traded baskets until two Sam Perkins free throws gave Carolina a 58–56 lead with two seconds to play.  Duke inbounded to midcourt and called time out with one second left.  Banks took the inbounds pass and nailed a jumper at the buzzer to force overtime.  The Blue Devils took a 62–59 lead early in the extra session, but Carolina rallied to take a 65–64 lead on the strength of an Al Wood jumper and two free throws by Mike Pepper.  Duke's Vince Taylor misfired on a short jumper, but Banks rebounded and banked home the game-winner with 19 seconds left.  Banks led Duke with 25 points, while Perkins scored 24 for Carolina. Perkins also had 10 assists.

March 3, 1984: #1 North Carolina 96, Duke 83 (2OT)
At Carmichael Auditorium, Chapel Hill
The final home game for Matt Doherty, Michael Jordan, and Sam Perkins was a memorable one for Tar Heels fans. Carolina looked to be finished when Duke's Mark Alarie converted a three-point play with 20 seconds to go in regulation and the Tar Heels missed a jumper that would have tied the game.  However, after the Blue Devils missed the front end of a one-and-one, Matt Doherty took the inbounds pass the length of the court and hit a 15-footer with one second left to force overtime.  The teams traded baskets during the first overtime and headed for the second extra session tied at 79.  Michael Jordan opened the second overtime with an ally oop and a free throw, but Johnny Dawkins cut the North Carolina lead to 82–81 with a short jumper.  Duke would get only one more basket as Jordan and Sam Perkins carried the Tar Heels to the 96–83 final, and Carolina became the first ACC team in 10 years to go undefeated in conference play (14–0).  Alarie led all scorers with 28 points, while Jordan topped Carolina with 25.

March 10, 1984: #16 Duke 77, #1 North Carolina 75
At Greensboro Coliseum, Greensboro (ACC tournament semifinals)
After losing two close games to Carolina in the regular season, Duke finally upset the Tar Heels in the semifinals of the ACC tournament. Johnny Dawkins and Tommy Amaker led the Blue Devils to a 40–32 halftime advantage.  Nevertheless, Carolina went on a 12–2 run to open the second half, tying the score at 44 in a game that was close the rest of the way. David Henderson hit four late free throws to keep Duke in the lead, but Michael Jordan closed the gap to 77–75. Carolina regained possession with three seconds left in the game, but the Tar Heels comeback bid ended with Matt Doherty's errant inbounds pass.  Jordan led all scorers with 22 points, while Doherty scored 20 and grabbed 10 rebounds.

January 18, 1986: #1 North Carolina 95, #3 Duke 92

At the Dean Smith Center, Chapel Hill
The number 1 ranked Tar Heels opened the brand new Dean Smith Center against the number 3 ranked Blue Devils with the winner possibly becoming the number 1 ranked team in the nation. North Carolina survived a late Blue Devil rally to win 95–92.

January 21, 1988: #9 Duke 70, #2 North Carolina 69
At the Dean Smith Center, Chapel Hill
Duke opened the game with an 11–2 run and eventually led 29–15, but Carolina cut the lead to three before the Blue Devils took a 44–39 halftime lead.  Carolina still trailed 55–44 with 12:53 left when J.R. Reid took over the game.  Reid scored 14 of Carolina's final 16 points to help the Tar Heels tie the score at 69 with 1:24 to go.  A Danny Ferry free throw with 52 seconds remaining provided the winning margin for Duke, but not before Carolina forced a turnover and failed to convert on four field goal attempts in the final 30 seconds.  Kevin Strickland scored 22 points and Ferry added 19 for Duke, while Reid dropped in 27 for the Tar Heels.  This would become the first of three Duke victories in a season sweep over Carolina in 1988, including the ACC tournament.

March 12, 1989: #9 North Carolina 77, #7 Duke 74
At the Omni Coliseum, Atlanta, Georgia (ACC tournament championship)
In one of the most intense games in the rivalry's history, Carolina defeated Duke 77–74 in the ACC tournament final at the Omni in Atlanta to secure the Heels' first ACC tournament title in seven seasons.  The teams had split the two regular season meetings; Carolina defeating top ranked and then undefeated Duke 91–71 in Cameron in January (a game notable for the infamous "J.R. Can't Reid" placard displayed by some Duke fans) then Duke returned the favor in Chapel Hill in the season finale, knocking off Carolina 88–86.  Tensions between coaches Dean Smith and Mike Krzyzewski boiled over during Tournament week, stemming from the Reid sign in Durham in January, and by the time the two teams met in the conference championship, the game had developed the atmosphere of a heavyweight title fight.  Carolina led for much of the game, including a 39–35 halftime lead, but never could pull away.  Carolina's J.R. Reid, however, outplayed Duke's Naismith Award-finalist and ACC tournament MVP Danny Ferry.  The game saw an incredible 49 fouls called between the two squads, and Carolina prevailed, but only when Ferry's 3/4 court shot rimmed out as time expired.

February 5, 1992: #9 North Carolina 75, #1 Duke 73
At the Dean Smith Center, Chapel Hill
In a rough game between the Blue Devils and Tar Heels that featured blood and broken bones, Duke used an early 9–0 run to take a 16–11 lead with 12:55 to go in the first half. Hubert Davis' three-point play capped off a Carolina run to give the Tar Heels a 20–19 lead.  The teams exchanged the lead 10 times before a Thomas Hill baseline jumper gave the Blue Devils a 39–38 halftime lead.  The Tar Heels opened the second half with a 10–0 spurt, but then saw its offense disappear.  Duke went five minutes before scoring a second-half basket but fought back with tough defense, holding Carolina without a field goal over the last  minutes of the game. Carolina hit 12 of 14 free throws during that stretch; including two by Derrick Phelps with 44.5 seconds remaining to give the Tar Heels a 75–73 lead. Christian Laettner had two shots to tie the game in the final 24 seconds, but missed both.  However, the lasting image from this game had to be Carolina's Eric Montross who took a couple of rough elbows to the face and looked more like a boxer than a center as he sank two late free throws with blood streaming down his face. Bobby Hurley broke his foot during the game, but continued playing. Brian Davis led Duke with 16 points, while Davis scored 16 for Carolina. In Duke's 1991–92 season, where they became the first team since UCLA in 1972 and 1973 to repeat as national champions and also were ranked #1 all year long, North Carolina was one of only two teams (the other being Wake Forest in Winston-Salem) to beat the Blue Devils.

February 2, 1995: #2 North Carolina 102, Duke 100 (2OT)

At Cameron Indoor Stadium, Durham
With Mike Krzyzewski on leave of absence for the year, the Blue Devils suffered through their worst season in well over a decade.  They seemed out-manned on their home court from the opening tip, falling behind 26–9 in the first half, highlighted by alley-oops by Carolina's Rasheed Wallace and a reverse jam by Jerry Stackhouse over two Blue Devils.  However, Duke rallied in the second half and led by as much as 12, before North Carolina staged a rally of its own.  The two squads exchanged leads four times at the end of regulation before heading into overtime.  With three seconds left in the first overtime, Carolina led 95–92 and sent Serge Zwikker to the foul line with the chance to ice the game for the heavily favored Tar Heels.  However Zwikker missed both free throws, setting up Duke's Jeff Capel for a running, 37-foot heave that tied the game as the buzzer sounded, sending Cameron into a state of euphoria.  With the game still tied late in the second overtime, Donald Williams scored for the Heels and Jeff McInnis stole the inbounds pass for an easy layup, putting Carolina up 102–98.  Duke answered with a basket of their own and after stopping the Tar Heels, had a chance to force a third overtime or win the game outright.  Nevertheless, Steve Wojciechowski's jumper missed and Greg Newton's putback drew nothing but air, preserving Carolina's 102–100 victory.

January 31, 1996: #8 North Carolina 73, Duke 72
At the Dean Smith Center, Chapel Hill
Duke took a 42–30 advantage into the locker room at halftime, and led 37–20 over Carolina with less than five minutes to go in the first half.  Carolina managed to close the gap to 44–42 with 14:14 left in the game, but the Blue Devils stretched the lead back to 11 with 8:44 left.  The Tar Heels fought back and pulled within one behind scoring from six different players over the next few minutes. Steve Wojciechowski hit a three-pointer to give Duke a 72–68 lead with 1:13 to go. Shammond Williams answered with a three to cut the Duke lead to one with 58 seconds left, and Carolina forced a turnover on the ensuing inbounds pass.  Jeff McInnis drove the lane and fed Serge Zwikker, whose shot was blocked by Greg Newton, but Dante Calabria was there for the tip-in and a 73–72 Carolina lead.  Duke's Ricky Price could not connect on a jumper at the buzzer, and the Tar Heels escaped.

February 28, 1998: #1 Duke 77, #3 North Carolina 75
At Cameron Indoor Stadium, Durham
Just two months removed from a broken foot that most assumed would sideline him for the season, Duke freshman Elton Brand rallied the Blue Devils from a 64–47 second-half deficit with 12 minutes remaining to a 77–75 victory over Carolina.  The victory earned Duke the ACC regular-season championship and Coach Mike Krzyzewski his 500th victory in the most memorable game of the college season.  Duke tied the game at 75 on a slashing floater by sophomore Chris Carrawell with 2:00 remaining and took the lead for the first time on a driving basket by Roshown McLeod one minute later as the Carolina offense lapsed into a series of turnovers and errant shots.  Both point guard Ed Cota and freshman center Brendan Haywood had a chance to tie the game from the free-throw line in the waning seconds, but both missed the first of two free throws, and the Tar Heels were unable to turn intentional misses on the second attempts into points.

February 3, 2000: #3 Duke 90, North Carolina 86 (OT)
At the Dean Smith Center, Chapel Hill
The Tar Heels were unranked coming into the game for the first time since 1990. Shane Battier scored 14 first-half points for Duke and Carolina turned the ball over 14 times to give the Blue Devils a 17-point halftime lead.  Duke eventually took a 19-point lead early in the second half.  Carolina then turned the tide down the stretch, scoring on 19 of its final 22 possessions, including a three-pointer by Joseph Forte with 5.2 seconds left to send the game to the extra period at 73.  The Blue Devils scored on their first six possessions in overtime and got seven points from Carlos Boozer in the extra frame to hold on for the 90–86 victory.

March 4, 2001: #2 Duke 95, #4 North Carolina 81
At the Dean Smith Center, Chapel Hill
Earlier in the year, Matt Doherty had won his first rivalry game as North Carolina coach after returning from Notre Dame to succeed Bill Guthridge 85–83 in Durham. Entering the game, Duke had lost starting center Carlos Boozer to a broken foot in their Senior Night loss to Maryland, which ultimately ruled him out until the Sweet Sixteen. Faced with a disadvantage inside as the Tar Heels still fielded Brendan Haywood and power forward Kris Lang, Mike Krzyzewski adopted an uptempo game plan designed to tire the Tar Heels out. Duke led at the half 42–40 but pulled away as Doherty was prompted to switch to a smaller lineup in the second half to match the Blue Devils' pace. Duke also won the rubber match in Atlanta in the ACC tournament championship 79–53 en route to the third national championship for both Krzyzewski and the school.

February 4, 2004: #1 Duke 83, #17 North Carolina 81 (OT)
At the Dean Smith Center, Chapel Hill
In the first game in the Carolina–Duke rivalry pitting Mike Krzyzewski against new UNC head coach Roy Williams, Chris Duhon's reverse layup with 6.5 seconds left in overtime gave Duke its 16th straight victory overall and fifth victory in the last six years on Carolina's home court.  Duke turned up the defense late in regulation and went on a 10–0 run, taking a 72–69 lead on two free throws by Luol Deng with 1:06 left. Sean May scored on a rebound with 53 seconds to go, but JJ Redick restored the three-point lead on a drive with 38 seconds left.  After a Carolina timeout, Jawad Williams hit a game-tying three-pointer with 18 seconds left; Daniel Ewing missed a potential game-winner for Duke with 3 seconds left.  In overtime, Shelden Williams had two blocks and his defense forced Carolina into a 35-second shot clock violation with 22 seconds left.  Redick then made two free throws to make it 81–78 and Rashad McCants drilled the game-tying three that set the stage for Duhon's heroics.

March 6, 2005: #2 North Carolina 75, #6 Duke 73
At the Dean Smith Center, Chapel Hill
On Senior Day in Chapel Hill, before the largest crowd to see a college game on-campus in the state of North Carolina (22,125), the Tar Heels had a chance to win their first outright ACC regular-season title since 1993. However, they trailed Duke 73–64 with 3:07 left after Duke's Lee Melchionni made a 3. Offensive rebounds and subsequent put-backs by Carolina's Jawad Williams and Marvin Williams, the latter set up by a Duke turnover, cut the lead to five with two minutes to go.  Duke's DeMarcus Nelson then missed the front end of a one-and-one. Sean May then rebounded a miss of his own, and was fouled on the put-back; he hit the free throw to make it 73–71 with 1:44 left. Misses by Melchionni and JJ Redick gave the ball back to the Tar Heels, but Duke's Shelden Williams came up with a huge block to regain possession for the Blue Devils with less than a minute to go. Duke inbounded the ball and looked to move it quickly up court, but Carolina's David Noel chased down Daniel Ewing from behind and knocked the ball away before he could get a pass off. Raymond Felton came up with the loose ball in a scrum and called for time, setting up a game-tying possession for the Tar Heels – an eerily similar scenario to the game a month earlier at Cameron Indoor Stadium. This time, he took the ball to the hoop and got fouled with 19.4 seconds left. Felton hit the first, but missed the second. However, he redeemed himself for his failure at Cameron, and managed to tip the board to Marvin Williams, who took it straight back up, was fouled with 17 seconds left and banked it in to give the Tar Heels the lead and set off a wild celebration in the Smith Center. The free throw made it 75–73; Duke called time to set up one final play. Duke's sharpshooter, Redick, got the ball, but his 3-pointer rimmed out with 6.7 seconds left. Ewing's desperation jumper with 4 seconds left was an airball; May grabbed the rebound to run out the clock and seal the 75–73 comeback win.

March 4, 2006: #13 North Carolina 83, #1 Duke 76
At Cameron Indoor Stadium, Durham
Coming into the game ranked #1 in both polls, Duke hosted senior night, honoring the National Player of the Year and all-time ACC leading scorer JJ Redick and two-time National Defensive Player of the Year Shelden Williams.  North Carolina, the defending national champions, had lost the whole core of the team that won it all the year before, but came into the game on a 7-game winning streak.  Freshmen Tyler Hansbrough and Danny Green led Carolina as well as veterans Reyshawn Terry and David Noel.  ESPN broadcast the game on all three of its channels as part of its first ESPN Full Circle coverage, showing a marathon of past games hours before tipoff.  Duke led early 13–2 as Redick caught fire and hit his first five shots.  The Tar Heels fought back, cutting the deficit to one by halftime.  The Tar Heels stormed out to a 72–62 lead as Hansbrough and Terry starting hitting their shots in the second half.  After a timeout, Duke's Williams hook shot pulled Duke back within eight, but Hansbrough recovered a loose ball 25 feet from the hoop answered with a three-pointer to beat the shot clock.  DeMarcus Nelson then hit 3-pointers on 3 successive possessions to put the Devils back to within 3 with 1:31 left.  However, that was as close as it would get.  The Heels hit their free throws down the stretch, Redick missed 15 of his last 16 shots, and DeMarcus Nelson shot an air ball that resulted in a shot clock violation that prevented a late Duke rally, leading to a final score of 83–76.  The game was watched by 3.78 million households on ESPN and ESPN2.

March 4, 2007: #8 North Carolina 86, #14 Duke 72
At the Dean Smith Center, Chapel Hill
Carolina beat Duke at the Dean Smith Center 86–72, completing the season sweep of the Blue Devils.  The most memorable part of this game was a combative foul by Gerald Henderson when his elbow contacted Tyler Hansbrough's nose on a hard foul attempt with 14.5 seconds on the clock and the result of the game clearly determined.  The contact broke Hansbrough's nose, drawing blood.  The officials charged Henderson with a combative foul and ejected him from the game.  After the foul, Hansbrough jumped up with blood streaming from his nose, but was calmed by his teammate Dewey Burke, before heading to the locker room for medical attention.  Since then, both Hansbrough and Henderson have stated the foul was unintentional. To protect his broken nose, Hansbrough wore a face mask throughout the ACC tournament, and into the second round of the NCAA tournament.

February 8, 2012: #9 Duke 85, #5 North Carolina 84

At the Dean Smith Center, Chapel Hill
UNC held a lead of 10 points or more for most of the second half and were leading by 10 points until 2:09 when Duke's Tyler Thornton hit a 3-point shot quickly followed by another 3 by Seth Curry to close the margin to 4.  With just 14 seconds left in the game, Tyler Zeller accidentally tipped the ball into the Duke basket on a Duke 3-point shot by Ryan Kelly. Duke was awarded 2 points on the tip in by Zeller leaving Carolina with a 1-point lead. Duke's Tyler Thornton fouled Zeller who made his first shot but missed his second leaving Carolina with a 2-point lead.  Duke brought the ball up court following the defensive rebound off Zeller's missed free throw and Duke guard Austin Rivers – with his father, NBA player and coach Glenn "Doc" Rivers in attendance – hit the game-winning 3 over Zeller as time expired. Rivers finished the game with a career high 29 points, including six three-pointers.
 
Rameses, UNC's famed live mascot, died the next day. Ann Leonard, Rameses' owner, said the 8-year-old ram died peacefully, most likely of old age.

February 18, 2015: #4 Duke 92, #15 North Carolina 90 (OT) 

At Cameron Indoor Stadium, Durham
Entering the game at Duke's Cameron Indoor Stadium with the passing of North Carolina's long-time coach Dean Smith a couple of days before, both Duke and UNC coaches, players and staff all gathered at center court and held a moment of silence for Smith. Once the game started Duke jumped right out of the gate with an 18–6 lead early in the game thanks to hot shooting. UNC would respond by outscoring Duke 30–22 over the next several minutes of the 1st half to cut Duke's lead down to 40–36 with around 4 minutes left in the 1st half. Duke then went on a 9–0 run over the next 2 minutes to get their largest lead of the game at 49–36 with 2 minutes left in the half. UNC would score the last 6 points of the half to cut Duke's lead down to 49–42 at halftime. In the 2nd half almost everything went UNC's way as UNC started dominating the post and eventually built their largest lead of the game 77–67 over Duke with 4 minutes left in regulation to complete a 41–18 run over Duke in an 18-minute span. With Duke still trailing UNC 79–72 with around  minutes left in regulation Duke's Tyus Jones would help Duke finish regulation on a 9–2 run over UNC to tie the game at 81 points apiece to send it to overtime. In overtime, the game was filled with missed free throws, missed shots, fouls, turnovers, lead changes and ties with Duke eventually winning the game 92–90.

March 4, 2017: #5 North Carolina 90, #17 Duke 83 

At the Dean Smith Center, Chapel Hill
On senior night in Chapel Hill, UNC had already locked up the number one seed in the ACC with Louisville's loss to Notre Dame, but Duke still had to win to clinch a double-bye in the ACC tournament. Joel Berry II, who came off the bench so seniors could start, and Luke Kennard led the way for their respective teams and would score 28 points each. Berry made each of his five attempted three-pointers in the first half to supplement Isaiah Hicks's success in the post for UNC, while Duke's Kennard, Grayson Allen, and Jayson Tatum enjoyed success from outside the arc, including a bank shot for Kennard and a four-point play for Allen. Neither team led by more than four points in the first half, which ended with a 48–46 lead for UNC. In the second half, UNC stayed in front or tied until Frank Jackson would give Duke the lead on a free throw with fifteen minutes left in the regulation. In a game that ultimately featured 24 lead changes and 14 ties, Justin Jackson put UNC up 74–71 on a straightaway three-pointer after missing his first six attempts from outside the arc. After Jackson's shot, Duke would get as close as down by one but Berry scored seven straight points to keep UNC ahead. Allen uncharacteristically missed three consecutive free throws for Duke in the final minutes and UNC emerged victorious 90–83.

March 10, 2017: #14 Duke 93, #6 North Carolina 83 

At the Barclays Center, Brooklyn, New York (ACC tournament semifinals)
Six days after North Carolina avenged their earlier loss at Duke in February with a 90–83 victory at the Dean Dome, the two teams would face off in the semifinals of the ACC tournament, this time in Brooklyn. This game was only the fifth time that Duke and North Carolina had played each other outside of the state of North Carolina. North Carolina controlled the first half by outscoring Duke in the paint 32–10, with North Carolina's Kennedy Meeks leading the charge. North Carolina led by as many as 13 points and threatened to turn the game into a blowout, but Duke's Grayson Allen made four 3-pointers to get Duke within 7 points at the half, with North Carolina leading 49–42. In the second half, with North Carolina leading Duke 56–48 with 15:04 left, North Carolina's Joel Berry II picked up his fourth foul, which forced North Carolina to take him out of the game. Though North Carolina led by 13 points at 61–48 with 13:53 remaining, Duke used a 20–4 run over the next five minutes, thanks to steals and three-pointers from Duke's Jayson Tatum and Luke Kennard, to put Duke up 68–65 over North Carolina with 8:24 left. Duke then pulled away and won 93–83 to complete a 45–22 run over North Carolina in the final 14 minutes of the game.

February 20, 2019: #8 North Carolina 88, #1 Duke 72 

At Cameron Indoor Stadium, Durham
The first meeting between the rivals in the 2018–19 season at Duke was overshadowed by a freak injury to the Blue Devils' superstar freshman Zion Williamson during Duke's first possession of the game. While dribbling near the free throw line, Williamson tried to plant his left foot on the court. His shoe catastrophically failed, with the sole ripping loose from the midsole along its entire outside edge, causing Williamson's foot to go completely through the gap. He suffered what was later described as a mild sprain to his right knee in the incident, and never returned to the game. Following the incident, former United States president Barack Obama was shown on television mouthing the words "his shoe broke".  The Tar Heels took full advantage, never trailing at any time and leading by as many as 22 points on their way to the win. Luke Maye starred for North Carolina with 30 points and 15 rebounds.

March 15, 2019: #5 Duke 74, #3 North Carolina 73 

At the Spectrum Center, Charlotte (ACC tournament semifinals)
After Duke's Zion Williamson only played the first 30 seconds of the 1st meeting and missed all of the 2nd meeting against North Carolina due to a mild knee sprain in his right knee he was finally able to play a full game against North Carolina in the semifinals of the ACC tournament. North Carolina blitzed Duke early thanks to hot shooting from Cam Johnson to put North Carolina up 33–20 over Duke with about  minutes left in the 1st half. Duke's Zion Williamson finally got going and scored 12 of Duke's last 24 points of the half to help Duke comeback and tie the score at 44 points a piece at halftime. The second half was neck and neck the entire way with both teams having their best players making big play after big play. Both teams became tired down the stretch and both teams suffered small scoring droughts at different parts late in the second half. In the end Duke was able to hold off North Carolina's last 2 shot attempts at winning the game to escape with a 74–73 win over North Carolina to snap a 3-game losing streak to their biggest rival and advance to the ACC tournament championship game. Zion Williamson was the hero for Duke after scoring 31 points in his second game back from injury.

February 8, 2020: #7 Duke 98, North Carolina 96 (OT) 

At the Dean Smith Center, Chapel Hill
North Carolina entered this first rivalry game of 2020 with a 10–12 overall record (3–8 in conference play), their worst season record in 18 years. Ranked #7, Duke was a clear favorite to win this away match-up, having been in the top 10 all year. However, the Tar Heels outperformed expectations, in part due to 24 points and 11 rebounds by Cole Anthony, who had recently returned from a lengthy injury leave. North Carolina lead 44–35 at halftime and held a 13-point lead with 3:55 remaining in regulation time. However, they struggled with free throws, shooting 21-of-38 on the night, and Duke mounted a comeback, cutting the lead to five points with 0:20 remaining. Duke point guard Tre Jones scored 8 points in the final 50 seconds of regulation. Down 84–82 with 4.4 seconds remaining, Jones sent the game to overtime by intentionally ricocheting a free throw off the rim, rebounding, and sinking a 2-point buzzer-beater. In the extra period, North Carolina initially pulled ahead again, and held a 96–91 lead with 0:21 remaining. However, after a basket by Jones and a controversial non-foul call in Duke's favor, the Blue Devils trailed by only one point in the final seconds. At the free throw line again, Jones made his first but missed the second. After scrambling to rebound, Jones put up an off-target shot, which teammate Wendell Moore Jr. rebounded and put it back at the buzzer to give Duke the 98–96 victory.

March 5, 2022: North Carolina 94, #4 Duke 81 

At Cameron Indoor Stadium, Durham
In Duke coach Mike Krzyzewski's final game in Cameron Indoor Stadium, unranked North Carolina traveled to Durham as heavy underdogs, having already lost to the fourth-ranked Blue Devils 87–67 in Chapel Hill on February 6. Led by first year head coach Hubert Davis, North Carolina was off to the races early, building an 11–4 lead early in the first half. However, thanks to hot shooting by Paolo Banchero, Duke would go on a 14–0 run later in the half, converting a 28–23 UNC lead to a 37–28 Duke lead in just over 3 minutes of game time. The Tar Heels made a push at the very end of the first half, capping it off with a buzzer-beating triple from R. J. Davis to cut the Blue Devil lead to two. Duke extended their lead to as many as seven in the second half, but a balanced team effort allowed North Carolina to claw back. With some late-game heroics from all five UNC starters, the Tar Heels dominated the Blue Devils 38–20 in the final 10:30 of regulation to pull off the stunning road upset in front of the Cameron Crazies and 96 of Coach K's former players.

April 2, 2022: (#8 East) North Carolina 81, #9 (#2 West) Duke 77 

At the Caesars Superdome, New Orleans, Louisiana (NCAA Tournament Final Four)
The first NCAA Tournament matchup in the rivalry's history. 2022 marked the second time both teams made the Final Four after Indianapolis in 1991, but unlike 1991, both teams were matched against each other with the winner playing Kansas (victor against Villanova in the earlier national semifinal) in the national championship game. Ahead of the game, Governor Roy Cooper signed a proclamation proclaiming the state of North Carolina as the center of the college basketball universe.

During the tournament, Mike Krzyzewski passed UCLA's John Wooden for the most Final Four appearances by a single head coach, while North Carolina also set a record with their 21st Final Four appearance and beat two Final Four teams from the previous season in UCLA and reigning national champion Baylor.

In a thriller that included 18 lead changes, Carolina overcame a 3-point halftime deficit to win 81–77. It was Carolina's 7th win vs Duke in their previous 11 meetings. North Carolina was led by sophomore Caleb Love, whose 28-point performance included a clutch 3-point shot that stretched the North Carolina lead to 4 with only 24.8 seconds remaining and signaled the conclusion of both Duke's season and Krzyzewski's career. Having bested him for the second game in a row in his rookie season as head coach, Hubert Davis led North Carolina into the national championship against Kansas, where they would lose 72–69.

Route to the game

Student engagement and tenting
In order to get standing room in the annual Duke-UNC game in Cameron Indoor Stadium, Duke students set up tents and sleep outside in a grassy area outside of the stadium known as Krzyzewskiville and named after head coach Mike Krzyzewski.  The process of lining up for tickets can last up to two months depending on the level of tenting the students choose to do and whether the game in Cameron Indoor is the first or second meeting of the teams during the season. The complex tenting rules are enforced by a set of students known as Line Monitors who regulate the tents and serve as leaders for the student section during the games.

Duke students who regularly camp in Krzyzewskiville are known for their methodical preparedness, bringing headlamps, portable chargers, shoe bins, and many layers of clothing to endure the North Carolina winters (games are typically played in February or March, when the average low in Durham is 29.5 and 37 degrees Fahrenheit, respectively). In the hours leading up to the game, students play music and put on dark blue and white paint (Duke's colors).

After the game, dependent on a win by the Duke Blue Devils, students rush out to their main residential quads (only a short distance from Cameron Indoor Stadium), and burn benches. Many residential communities at Duke traditionally build and paint benches for day-to-day use in the hopes of burning them in celebration of a win over Carolina.  The students then rebuild benches shortly after in hopes of being able to burn them again the next year.

At Carolina, a win over Duke typically results in students rushing Franklin Street, the main thoroughfare just north of UNC's campus and the commercial heart of Chapel Hill. Police block off the street before the game in anticipation of thousands of students celebrating the win. Bonfires are also a feature of these celebrations, often using Duke gear as fuel.

Results

Scores of games (1920–2023)

Ranking of the team at the time of the game by the AP poll is shown in parenthesis next to the team name (failure to list AP ranking does not necessarily mean the team was not ranked at the time of the game).

Achievements by season (1975–2022)

* This was the last year of a balanced regular season schedule (each team played a home-and-away series with every other conference foe).  In subsequent years, this was not possible due to conference expansion.

† The NCAA tournament was canceled in response to the COVID-19 global pandemic of 2020. The ACC tournament was canceled after the second round after North Carolina was eliminated and Duke had yet to play a game.

Football

The football rivalry is also intense, although not as intense as the basketball rivalry.  While both schools agree that Carolina holds a large lead in the series, the two schools disagree on an 1889 game in which both teams thought they were supposed to be the home team. Carolina claims a 58–36–4 lead; Duke claims UNC leads 57–37–4. On 10/20/12, Duke beat UNC in football for the first time since 2003. On 11/30/13, Duke beat UNC in football for the second straight year, 27–25, winning back to back games in the series for the first time since 1989.  That year, Duke won its seventh ACC Championship, while UNC has won five times.  The 2013 win also gave Duke the outright Coastal Division championship and sent Duke to the ACC Championship Game for the first time since its 2005 inception and became the first Coastal Division representative other than Virginia Tech or Georgia Tech.  Duke is the last university in the North Carolina Triangle region to win an ACC football championship. The two game win streak by Duke was snapped in 2014 on a nationally televised Thursday game when the Tar Heels beat Duke 45–20 at Wallace Wade Stadium. The upset loss took the Blue Devils out of a second ACC Championship game and allowed Georgia Tech to win the Coastal Division because Duke had also lost to Miami and Virginia Tech while Georgia Tech only had 2 conference losses.

Nonetheless, there is some tradition behind the football rivalry.  The two teams first met in 1888, and the rivalry has been renewed every year since 1922.  In the 1920s Duke began appearing as the last game of the Carolina football season with some regularity, Virginia being the other team with that spot.
The Tar Heels-Blue Devils matchup would be the last regular season game for both teams for all but a few years from the 1930s until the ACC split into two divisions in 2005.  Now the schedules are less predictable.  The matchups at Wallace Wade Stadium in 2014 and 2016 took place on Thursday night and were televised on ESPN, adding national exposure to the rivalry.

Other sports

The rivalry between Duke and Carolina has spilled over into other arenas.  From 2001 until 2011, the rivalry was strengthened by the awarding of the Carlyle Cup.  This cup was given each year to the school that had the most combined head-to-head wins against the other school in all of the shared varsity sports.  UNC claimed the cup 7 times, winning in 2002, 2005, 2006, 2008, 2009, 2010, and 2011.  Duke won the cup 3 times, in 2001, 2003, and 2004.  UNC and Duke tied for the cup in 2007.

Duke and Carolina have also developed a strong women's college basketball rivalry since the 1990s as Duke and Carolina field two of the strongest women's basketball teams in the nation.  Duke made four Women's Final Four appearances in 1999, 2002, 2003, and 2006.  Carolina made three Women's Final Four appearances in 1994 (winning its only NCAA Women's Division I Basketball Championship), 2006, and 2007.

In 1992 North Carolina defeated Duke by a 9–1 score in the NCAA championship game in women's soccer in a game played in Chapel Hill's Fetzer Field, a decided home advantage for the Tar Heels.  UNC was led by future Team USA legends Kristine Lilly and Mia Hamm.  This is the only time the two schools have ever met for a national championship in any sport.

In men's lacrosse the two schools have developed a fierce rivalry that carries national implications. Duke has won national championships in men's lacrosse in 2010, 2013, and 2014, while North Carolina has five titles. In 2007, 2008, and 2010, Duke and North Carolina played each other in the NCAA lacrosse quarterfinals, with Duke winning each time. The programs have also met 13 times in ACC postseason play, with UNC leading the overall rivalry 42–33 through 2020.  For further information, see Duke–North Carolina lacrosse rivalry.

Twenty four students from the two schools got together from January 14–16, 2006 in order to attempt to break the world record for the longest continuous game of basketball ever recorded. The game set a new world record at 57 hours, 17 minutes and 41 seconds with Duke winning the game 3699–3444. All $60,000 raised from the marathon benefited the Hoop Dreams Basketball Academy, an organization which helps children with life-threatening illnesses develop successful life skills through basketball.

School newspapers

As a tradition, one day prior to a Duke-Carolina basketball game, The Chronicle, Duke's student newspaper, publishes a spoof cover page for the day's edition with the title The Daily Tar Hole. Contained within are fake news stories poking fun at The Daily Tar Heel and the North Carolina Tar Heels.  The Daily Tar Heel typically publishes former columnist Ian Williams' "Insider's guide to hating Duke" for the two basketball match-ups each year.  There is a longstanding agreement that if Duke wins the first matchup, The Daily Tar Heel's masthead is printed in Duke blue, and if Carolina wins the first matchup, The Chronicle's masthead is painted Carolina blue. The losing school's paper also has to put the other school's logo in a conspicuous location and claim that the winning school is "still the best."

See also
Duke Blue Devils men's basketball
North Carolina Tar Heels
Cameron Crazies

References

Further reading
 To Hate Like This Is to Be Happy Forever: A Thoroughly Obsessive, Intermittently Uplifting, and Occasionally Unbiased Account of the Duke-North Carolina Basketball Rivalry by Will Blythe 
 Blue Blood: Duke-Carolina: Inside the Most Storied Rivalry in College Hoops by Art Chansky

External links

 Men's basketball game log (1950–present) via Sports Reference

College basketball rivalries in the United States
Duke Blue Devils
University of North Carolina at Chapel Hill rivalries
College sports in North Carolina